Jingyang District is a district of the city of Deyang, Sichuan Province, China.

Transport
Jingyang railway station will be a future infill station on Chengdu–Mianyang–Leshan intercity railway.

Notable villages
Wuhui village in Xiaoquan town in Jingyang District covers an area of 4.8 square kilometers. The area of the cultivated land is 5,000 mu (about 823.68 acres). As of c. 2015 it had a population of 4,274. There were a total of 1,473 households.

References

Districts of Sichuan
Deyang